Hum Hum, known by locals as Cheetah Falls, is a waterfall in the Razkandi reserve forest in Kamalganj, Moulvibazar District, Bangladesh. It was discovered in late 2010 by a group of tourists wandering in the remote jungle with tourist guide Shyamal Deva Barma.

The height of the fall is about 147 to 160 feet.

References

Waterfalls of Bangladesh
Kamalganj Upazila